Krupac may refer to the following places:

Bosnia and Herzegovina
 Krupac, Istočna Ilidža, Republika Srpska
 Krupac, Konjic

Serbia
 Krupac (Bela Palanka)
 Krupac (Pirot)

Elsewhere
 Krupac (Martian crater)